The eastern grey kangaroo (Macropus giganteus) is a marsupial found in the eastern third of Australia, with a population of several million. It is also known as the great grey kangaroo and the forester kangaroo.

Taxonomy
The eastern grey kangaroo was described by George Shaw in 1790 as Macropus giganteus.

Subspecies
There are two subspecies:
Macropus giganteus giganteusfound in eastern and central Queensland, Victoria, New South Wales and southeastern South Australia
Macropus giganteus tasmaniensis(commonly known as the Forester Kangaroo) endemic to Tasmania

Description

The eastern grey kangaroo is the second largest and heaviest living marsupial and native land mammal in Australia. Large males of this species are more heavily built and muscled than the lankier red kangaroo and can occasionally exceed normal dimensions.

The eastern grey is easy to recognise: its soft grey coat is distinctive, and it is usually found in moister, more fertile areas than the red. Red kangaroos, though sometimes grey-blue in colour, have a totally different face than eastern grey kangaroos. Red kangaroos have distinctive markings in black and white beside their muzzles and along the sides of their face. Eastern grey kangaroos do not have these markings, and their eyes seem large and wide open.

Where their ranges overlap, it is much more difficult to distinguish between eastern grey and western grey kangaroos, which are closely related. They have a very similar body and facial structure, and their muzzles are fully covered with fine hair (though that is not obvious at a distance, their noses do look noticeably different from the noses of reds and wallaroos). The eastern grey's colouration is a light-coloured grey or brownish-grey, with a lighter silver or cream, sometimes nearly white, belly. The western grey is a dark dusty brown colour, with more contrast especially around the head. Indigenous Australian names include iyirrbir (Uw Oykangand and Uw Olkola) and kucha (Pakanh). The highest ever recorded speed of any kangaroo was  set by a large female eastern grey kangaroo.

Ecology
Although the red is better known, the eastern grey is the kangaroo most often encountered in Australia, due to its adaptability. Few Australians visit the arid interior of the continent, while many live in and around the major cities of the southern and eastern coast, from where it is usually only a short drive to the remaining pockets of near-city bushland where kangaroos can be found without much difficulty. The eastern grey prefers open grassland with areas of bush for daytime shelter and mainly inhabits the wetter parts of Australia. It also inhabits coastal areas, woodlands, sub-tropical forests, mountain forests, and inland scrubs.

Like all kangaroos, it is mainly nocturnal and crepuscular, and is mostly seen early in the morning, or as the light starts to fade in the evening. In the middle of the day, kangaroos rest in the cover of the woodlands and eat there but then come out in the open to feed on the grasslands in large numbers. The eastern grey kangaroo is predominantly a grazer, eating a wide variety of grasses, whereas some other species (e.g. the red kangaroo) include significant amounts of shrubs in their diet.

Behaviour
Eastern grey kangaroos are gregarious and form open-membership groups. The groups contain an average of three individuals. Smaller groups join together to graze in preferred foraging areas, and to rest in large groups around the middle of the day. They exist in a dominance hierarchy and the dominant individuals gain access to better sources of food and areas of shade. However, kangaroos are not territorial.
Eastern grey kangaroos adjust their behaviour in relation to the risk of predation with reproductive females, individuals on the periphery of the group and individuals in groups far from cover being the most vigilant. Vigilance in individual kangaroos does not seem to significantly decrease when the size of the group increases. However, there is a tendency for the proportion of individuals on the periphery of the group to decline as group size increases. The open membership of the group allows more kangaroos to join and thus provide more buffers against predators.

Reproduction

Females may form strong kinship bonds with their relatives. Females with living female relatives have a greater chance of reproducing. Most kangaroo births occur during the summer. Eastern grey kangaroos are obligate breeders in that they can reproduce in only one kind of habitat.

The female eastern grey kangaroo is usually permanently pregnant except on the day she gives birth; however, she has the ability to freeze the development of an embryo until the previous joey is able to leave the pouch. This is known as embryonic diapause, and will occur in times of drought and in areas with poor food sources. The composition of the milk produced by the mother varies according to the needs of the joey. In addition, the mother is able to produce two different kinds of milk simultaneously for the newborn and the older joey still in the pouch.
Unusually, during a dry period, males will not produce sperm, and females will conceive only if there has been enough rain to produce a large quantity of green vegetation. Females take care of the young without any assistance from the males. The joeys are heavily reliant on their mothers for about 550 days, which is when they are weaned. Females sexually mature between 17 and 28 months, while males mature at around 25 months.

Status
It is popularly thought, but not confirmed by evidence, that kangaroo populations have increased significantly since the European colonisation of Australia because of the increased areas of grassland (as distinct from forest), the reduction in dingo numbers, and the availability of artificial watering holes. The estimated population of the species Australia-wide in 2010 was 11.4 million. In some places the eastern grey is so numerous it causes overgrazing and some individual populations have been culled in some parts of Australia (see, for example, the Eden Park Kangaroo Cull). Despite the commercial harvest and some culls, the eastern grey remains common and widespread. Eastern greys are common in suburban and rural areas where they have been observed to form larger groups than in natural areas. It still covers the entire range it occupied when Europeans arrived in Australia in 1788 and it often comes into conflict with agriculture as it uses the more fertile districts that now carry crops or exotic pasture grasses, which kangaroos readily eat. Kangaroo meat has also been considered to replace beef in recent years, as their soft feet are preferable to hooves in erosion prone areas.

References

Macropods
Mammals of Tasmania
Mammals of South Australia
Mammals of New South Wales
Mammals of Queensland
Mammals of Victoria (Australia)
Marsupials of Australia
Mammals described in 1790
Extant Zanclean first appearances
Taxa named by George Shaw